Alured Blanchard Gray (20 November 1874 – 2 September 1931) was an Australian rules footballer who played for the Essendon Football Club in the Victorian Football League (VFL).

Notes

External links 
		

1874 births
1931 deaths
Australian rules footballers from Melbourne
Essendon Football Club players
Collegians Football Club players